North Eastern Telecommunications Company (Netco Ltd.) is a telecommunications company established in 1993 in Bosaso, the commercial capital of Puntland an autonomous region of Somalia.

Overview
Netco is owned by Ismael Haji Abdi, an MBA graduate from Wisconsin University, USA, and is part of the Somali Telecom Group of companies. It is the largest telecommunications firm in the autonomous Puntland region of Somalia.

Netco is a rapidly developing company and has grown massively in the past 15 years, with a current customer-base of over 800,000 individuals.

Services
The company supplies home phones, mobile phone networks and internet services. One of Netco's next targets is to supply electricity throughout Puntland, a project which will take place within the next five years.

See also
Somtel
Golis Telecom Somalia
Hormuud Telecom
Telcom
Somali Telecom Group
NationLink Telecom
Somafone

References
 NICI Policy – Somalia – Telecommunications Structure and Policy Lists telecommunications service providers in Somalia.
 Somalia Watch – Column by Faarah M. Mohamed, Friday, February 9, 2001 – God Bless Bosaaso! (mentions Ismael Abdi Ahmed at Betco)

Telecommunications companies of Somalia
Bosaso
1993 establishments in Somalia